Vincent Wan Ka Hung is a Hong Kong actor under Hong Kong's Television Broadcast Limited. He is also working under TVB Jade when he starred in Relic of an Emissary. He has starred in a few films such as Moonlight Resonance. He has starred in other films such as Relic of an Emissary portraying Chu Chun, Prince Su (朱椿) and Gun Metal Grey as Photographer Ben Yue.

Education
Vincent graduated from the University College of London in England. He can speak a range of languages such as Mandarin, Cantonese and English. Seeing his type in English, he has a range of favorite actors such as Ewan McGregor, Johnny Depp, Matt Damon, Shia LaBeouf.

Filmography

References

Living people
1984 births
Hong Kong male television actors
Alumni of University College London
actors from Reading, Berkshire
Male actors from Berkshire
British emigrants to China